Beyt-e Sharhan (also Romanized as Beyt-e Sharhān) is a village in Jaffal Rural District, in the Central District of Shadegan County, Khuzestan Province, Iran. At the 2006 census, its population was 67, in 9 families.

References 

Populated places in Shadegan County